Jacques Merquey (born 26 September 1929) also known by the nickname of "Jackiew", as a French rugby footballer of the 1950s. While Merquey started in union, he played the vast majority of his career in rugby league. He played his club rugby league for Marseille, Sporting Olympique Avignon XIII and Lezignan, becoming the most capped International, with 37 games for France. Merquey is the only Frenchman to play in the first three successive World Cups, in 1954, 1957 and 1960.

Merquey originally played rugby union, where he also represented France, in a total of four games against England, Wales, Ireland and Scotland in 1950.

However he much preferred rugby league and quickly changed codes.

In 1951 Merquey was part of the first ever French rugby league tour of Australia. Merquey played superbly throughout the three Test series, won triumphantly by France 2-1 before over 157,000 spectators.  

He was selected to represent France as they hosted the 1954 Rugby League World Cup, also the first ever. His French side beat New Zealand. He played a strong role in France's draw with Great Britain and scored a crucial try in the victory over Australia to secure a position in the final, where France lost 12 to 6 to Great Britain.

In the 1957 Rugby League World Cup, Merquey captained France, scoring a try in the defeat by Great Britain and leading them to victory over New Zealand. He was then selected to captain the Rest-of-the-World side against Australia.

The 1960 Rugby League World Cup would be his last, where he played stand-off in all of France's games.

References

1929 births
Living people
Dual-code rugby internationals
France international rugby union players
France national rugby league team captains
France national rugby league team players
French rugby league players
French rugby union players
Marseille XIII players
Rugby league centres
Rugby league five-eighths
Sporting Olympique Avignon players
Villeneuve Leopards players
Sportspeople from Lot (department)
RC Toulonnais players
Rugby union centres